Samuel Montembeault (born October 30, 1996) is a Canadian professional ice hockey goaltender for the Montreal Canadiens of the National Hockey League (NHL). He was selected by the Florida Panthers, 77th overall, in the 2015 NHL Entry Draft.

Playing career

Junior
Montembeault first played junior hockey in his native Quebec, with the Trois-Rivières Estacades of the QMAAA from 2011 to 2013. Showing early promise as the starting goaltender with the Estacades, Montembeault was selected to the Second All-Star Team and collected the best goalie prospect award from the 2012–13 season. He was selected 40th overall by the Blainville-Boisbriand Armada in the 2013 Quebec Major Junior Hockey League Entry Draft.

After appearing in a career high 52 games with Armada during his second season in the QMJHL in 2014–15, Montembeault was selected by the Florida Panthers in the third round, 77th overall, of the 2015 NHL Entry Draft.

In the following 2015–16 season, recorded a 17–19–8 record with a 2.63 goals against average, .901 save percentage with three shutouts. Leading Armada in the post-season, Montembeault was named the Vaughn Canadian Hockey League Goaltender of the Week for the week ending April 3 after earning a 3–1 record, 2.27 goals against average and .933 save percentage during Blainville’s first round playoff series win against Val-d'Or Foreurs. Montembeault finished the postseason with a 2.45 goals against average, .925 save percentage and one shutout.

On May 11, 2016, Montembeault was signed to a three-year, entry-level contract with the Florida Panthers. He returned for his final junior season in the QMJHL, establishing new career high with 2.40 goals against average and a .907 save percentage.

Professional

Florida Panthers
In his first professional season, Montembeault attended the Panthers 2017 training camp, before he was re-assigned to begin the 2017–18 season in the American Hockey League with affiliate, the Springfield Thunderbirds. He made his professional debut, making 25 saves for the Thunderbirds, in a 3–2 defeat to the Providence Bruins on October 13, 2017. He collected his first win in his 7th outing, backstopping the Thunderbirds in a 5–3 decision over the Hartford Wolf Pack on November 3, 2017. With the Thunderbirds finishing well out of the playoffs, Montembeault finished with 13 wins through 41 games.

Montembeault was assigned to continue in the AHL with Springfield to begin the 2018–19 season. After 33 games with the Thunderbirds, having already matched his previous win totals, Montembeault received his first recall by Panthers due to starting goaltender Roberto Luongo briefly leaving the team on bereavement leave, on February 18, 2019. In his second recall to the Panthers following an injury to backup James Reimer, Montembeault made his NHL debut in his first career start with the Panthers in a 4–3 overtime defeat to the Carolina Hurricanes at the BB&T Center in Sunrise, Florida on March 2, 2019.

Montreal Canadiens
On October 1, 2021, Montembeault was placed on waivers by the Panthers. The following day, he was claimed by the Montreal Canadiens. Montembeault made his debut for the team in a pre-season game against the Toronto Maple Leafs, where the Canadiens lost 6–2, but Montembeault was widely credited for a strong performance despite weak defending by the team. Following starting goaltender Carey Price's taking a leave of absence for mental health reasons, Montembeault temporarily became the primary backup goaltender to Jake Allen. On January 12, 2022, Allen was injured in a game against the Boston Bruins and subsequently announced to be out for at least two months, with Montembeault becoming the Canadiens' starting goaltender in the meantime. The Canadiens named him their player of the month for January, having become the first goaltender in team history to post two consecutives games with 48 saves or more. He earned his first NHL shutout win against the Buffalo Sabres on February 23, 2022. Following Allen's return he played only sparingly, but after Allen's re-injury in early April he was again the team's starting goaltender, pending the return of Price. Following the conclusion of the season, Montembeault underwent wrist surgery.

On July 18, 2022, Montembeault was re-signed to a two-year, $2 million contract extension with the Canadiens.

Career statistics

Awards and honours

References

External links
 

1996 births
Living people
Blainville-Boisbriand Armada players
Canadian ice hockey goaltenders
Florida Panthers draft picks
Florida Panthers players
Montreal Canadiens players
Ice hockey people from Quebec
People from Centre-du-Québec
Springfield Thunderbirds players
Syracuse Crunch players